Fatima Alkaramova (born 26 June 2002) is an Azerbaijani swimmer. She competed in the women's 100 metre freestyle event at the 2016 Summer Olympics.

References

External links
 
 

2002 births
Living people
Azerbaijani female swimmers
Olympic swimmers of Azerbaijan
Swimmers at the 2016 Summer Olympics
Swimmers at the 2018 Summer Youth Olympics
Azerbaijani female freestyle swimmers
Islamic Solidarity Games competitors for Azerbaijan
21st-century Azerbaijani women